Hubert Milton J. Nelson (August 14, 1907 – May 10, 1981) was a professional ice hockey player. Born in Minneapolis, Minnesota, Nelson played professionally in United States Hockey League for the Minneapolis Millers (AHA) and St. Louis Flyers. He was inducted into the United States Hockey Hall of Fame in 1978.

External links
 United States Hockey Hall of Fame biography
 

1907 births
1981 deaths
American men's ice hockey goaltenders
Ice hockey people from Minneapolis
United States Coast Guard Cutters players
United States Hockey Hall of Fame inductees